Tasman parakeet may refer to:

 Lord Howe red-crowned parakeet
 Norfolk Island green parrot

Animal common name disambiguation pages